Binitarianism is a Christian theology of two persons, personas, or aspects in one substance/Divinity (or God). Classically, binitarianism is understood as a form of monotheism—that is, that God is absolutely one being—and yet with binitarianism there is a "twoness" in God, which means one God family. The other common forms of monotheism are "unitarianism", a belief in one God with one person, and "trinitarianism", a belief in one God with three persons.

Scholarly views of early Christian theology 
Larry W. Hurtado of University of Edinburgh uses the word "binitarian" to describe the position of early Christian devotion to God, which ascribes to the Son (Jesus) an exaltedness that in Judaism would be reserved for God alone, while still affirming as in Judaism that God is one and is alone to be worshiped. He writes:...there are a fairly consistent linkage and subordination of Jesus to God 'the Father' in these circles, evident even in the Christian texts from the latter decades of the 1st century that are commonly regarded as a very 'high' Christology, such as the Gospel of John and Revelation. This is why I referred to this Jesus-devotion as a 'binitarian' form of monotheism: there are two distinguishable figures (God and Jesus), but they are posited in a relation to each other that seems intended to avoid the ditheism of two gods.
Hurtado does not describe binitarianism as antithetical to Nicene Christianity but rather as an indication that early Christians (before Nicaea) were monotheistic (as evidenced by their singular reference to the Father as God) yet also devoted to Jesus as pre-existent, co-eternal, the creator, embodying the power of God, by whom the Father is revealed, and in whose name alone the Father is worshiped. He writes, "The central place given to Jesus ... and ... their concern to avoid ditheism by reverencing Jesus rather consistently with reference to 'the Father', combine to shape the proto-orthodox 'binitarian' pattern of devotion. Jesus truly is reverenced as divine."

Hurtado's view might be interpreted as urging that, at this stage in the development of the Church's understanding, it could be said that God is a person (the Father) and one being; and that Jesus is distinct from the Father, was pre-existent with God, and also originating from God without becoming a being separate from him, so that he is God (the Son). This view of a  would posit a unity of God's being and a oneness of the object of worship, which is sympathetic to its predecessor view in Judaism; and it also displays a plurality of simultaneous identities, which is sympathetic to its successor in trinitarianism. It is a development in understanding of Christ, in other words, from which arose several subsequent ones in the further course of development that eventually came into conflict with one another.

Before Hurtado's influential work, one classic scholarly theory of binitarianism was that the Holy Spirit was seen as in some sense identical to the Son or uniquely embodied in him. The Shepherd of Hermas, among other sources, is cited to support the theory. Near the end of Parable Five, for example, an angel declares:The preexistent Holy Spirit, which created the whole creation, God caused to live in the flesh that he wished. This flesh, therefore, in which the Holy Spirit lived served the Spirit well, living in holiness and purity, without defiling the Spirit in any way. ... [I]t had lived honorably and chastely, and had worked with the Spirit and cooperated with it in everything.
The classic theory of Christian binitarian theology (assumed by most dictionary definitions) asserts that some early Christians conceived of the Spirit as going out from God the creator, and is the creator: a person of God's being, which also lived in Jesus (or, from other sources, appears to be thought of as Jesus's pre-existent, divine nature). This view further asserts that the same Spirit is given to men, making them a new creation and sharers in the same hope of resurrection and exaltation. This interpretation of early Christian belief is often cited in contrast to trinitarianism. However, trinitarians cite the same sources as examples of pre-Nicene Christian monotheism, which is not orthodoxy but "proto-orthodox"—that is, one of several versions among Christians which explain monotheism as a plurality (Father, Son, Spirit) in one being, prior to orthodoxy's settlement in Christianity.

By the time of the Arian controversy, some bishops defended a kind of "dual" conception of deity, which is sometimes called "Semi-Arian". Macedonianism (the Pneumatomachi) typifies this view, which some prefer to call "binitarian" as at that time the Semi-Arians were the main binitarians. None of the Semi-Arian views were strictly monotheistic (one being). All asserted that the God who speaks and the Word who creates are two beings similar to one another, of similar substance ( []), and denied that they are one and the same being, or two persons of the same substance ( []) in which two are distinguished, as Nicaea eventually held.

History 
Many Church of God binitarians (see below) believe their Christology perspective most accurately reflects that of the "original" Jewish Christians. Certain scholars have noted that "earliest Christian worship specifies two figures, God and Jesus, as recipients" and that early rabbis considered early Christianity to be binitarian.

After the 325 Council of Nicaea defeated Arianism, the Council of Constantinople was called in 381 to attempt to deal with the binitarians, who were referred to as "Semi-Arians". However, as the Trinity was finalized at this time as official Christian doctrine, the offended Semi-Arians walked out. "They rejected the Arian view that Christ was created and had a different nature from God ( []—dissimilar), but neither did they accept the Nicene Creed which stated that Christ was 'of one substance ( []) with the Father'. Semi-Arians taught that Christ was similar ( []) to the Father, or of like substance ( []), but still subordinate."

In the mid-4th century, orthodox apologist Epiphanius of Salamis noted, "Semi-Arians ... hold the truly orthodox view of the Son, that he was forever with the Father ... but has been begotten without beginning and not in time ... But all of these blaspheme the Holy Spirit, and do not count him in the Godhead with the Father and the Son."

After Ellen White gained influence in the American Adventist movement, in 1858 the binitarian Church of God (Seventh Day) was founded in the U.S. mid-western states of Michigan and Iowa having split from those Adventists who in 1863 founded the Seventh-day Adventist Church. Later, in 1897, Ellen White published a pamphlet declaring the Holy Spirit "the third person of the Godhead". Andrews University, an Adventist institution for higher learning, suggests that the Seventh-day Adventists were inclined towards binitarianism before this, which Gerhard Pfandl terms "Semi-Arian."

Church of God 
By the latter half of the 19th century, binitarianism was held by a relatively small group of church denominations. At present, it is a theology essentially held only by some 7th Day Church of God groups. The three largest church denominations that appear to hold a binitarian view today are the General Conference of the Church of God (Seventh Day) - with other Church of God (7th Day) groups remaining unitarian - the United Church of God, and the Living Church of God (the latter two originating from the Worldwide Church of God). Other groups, scattered spin-offs from the breakup of the previously sabbatarian Worldwide Church of God founded by Herbert W. Armstrong, also hold to a binitarian view of God. The sabbatarian Churches of God persist in their worship of Jesus and the Father; insisting that, in their worship of the "plural" God, "Elohim" (Gods), as multiple separate and individual God-beings of which only the Father and Son are now very God, they are practicing monotheism in the sense that "Elohim" is one family unit. Adherents of these churches believe they will eventually be born into that family as children of God at a resurrection of the dead at the second coming of Christ. They also believe that others will follow as children of God after Christ rules on Earth and teaches the correct way to live and follow him. These same groups insist certain human beings may eventually be gifted with all the attributes of the Father and Jesus. These humans who may enter the "God family" are currently only those found to be attending the congregations that openly support "pluralism", but after Jesus's return salvation shall be offered to all during the Great White Throne Judgment, which is a form of universal reconciliation. God's plural identification in Genesis as "Elohim", as the Father and the Word or Logos who became the Son of God, the firstborn of many brethren, leaves room for untold numbers to be added to God's family. This binitarian view posits that humanity eventually will have access to become members of God's family in their own right each with the power of the Holy Spirit, however, not equal to Father or Son.  As part of the binitarian view it is also believed that, as the Bible states, the Father is greater than Jesus.

Contrast with Trinitarians 
Trinitarians sometimes describe the modern binitarian view as "ditheist" or "dualist" instead of binitarian because in their misunderstanding of binitarianism some claim it posits that God is multiple beings, analogous to a human family; as all humans are also called "Man", after their first father, so in the Father's family, all born into his family are called "God". This is considered a form of polytheism in the traditional trinitarian view as well as in the unitarian or monotheistic point of view.

Semi-Arian binitarians do not believe that Jesus "was fully human and fully God", which is the position held by trinitarians. They believe that Jesus was God (the Word) prior to His incarnation, that He became fully human (finite) yet he was not fully God during the pre-resurrection incarnation as He did not have the powers etc. of God then, and that all authority was restored to Him (as well as his infinite God-status) at or shortly after the resurrection. They make three major claims to support that position:

Semi-Arian binitarians believe that Jesus emptied Himself of His Divinity while in the flesh, citing the same Scriptures which trinitarians cite to the opposite conclusion: that he denied himself the honor and glory he deserved, and hid the fact that he is equal to the Father, in order to serve those who were undeserving. 2 Corinthians 8:9 states that Jesus became poor, yet God is rich (Haggai 2:8), while Philippians 2:7 states, "... Christ Jesus, who subsisting in (the) form of God thought (it) not robbery to be equal to God, but emptied Himself, taking (the) form of a slave, becoming in (the) likeness of men". The Semi-Arian view of these texts is called kenosis, referring to the idea that what Jesus "emptied" himself of was his divinity (rather, than, say, his exalted position in Heaven).
They deny the trinitarian teaching that Jesus possessed two wills and two natures. For this reason, they view the assertions of Jesus that He "could do nothing" without the Father, prior to His resurrection (John 5:19,30; 8:28), as a denial by him that he had all divine rights until after the resurrection, when he claimed that he had "all authority in heaven and on earth" (Matthew 28:18). They conclude that it is because he had overcome the temptations of Satan and upon living the perfect sinless life would be "all powerful".
Similarly, they note that the Bible claims that Jesus was tempted in all points as humans are (Hebrews 4:15) and that in another place the Bible claims "God cannot be tempted by evil" (James 1:13). Denying the trinitarian view of two natures, Semi-Arian binitarians see the assertions as contradictory if posited of the same person and therefore, since "scripture cannot be broken" (John 10:35), Jesus could not have been fully God while in the flesh. But still that is contrary to Colossians 2:9 which says, "For in him dwelleth all the fullness of the Godhead bodily." and Luke 4:12 "And Jesus answered, and said unto him, It is said, Thou shalt not tempt the Lord thy God."

In other words, Semi-Arian binitarians believe that in the flesh Jesus was not who He was prior to His incarnation (God the Word), not what He was (i.e. not fully God with all authority) since His resurrection. He was God, then he was not fully God, then he was God again.

Trinitarians teach that the Holy Spirit is another person like the Son, who comes from God without becoming a separate being from him (Matthew 28:19–20; John 16:5–7; Acts 1:8, 2:4). Most binitarians teach that the Holy Spirit is essentially the power of God, with no distinct identity within God, and not a separate Being or Person as they conceive the Son to be.  For example, in its Official Statement of Fundamental Beliefs, the binitarian Living Church of God states, "The Holy Spirit is the very essence, the mind, life and power of God. It is not a Being. The Spirit is inherent in the Father and the Son, and emanates from Them throughout the entire universe (1 Kings 8:27; Psalm 139:7; Jeremiah 23:24). It was through the Spirit that God created all things (Genesis 1:1–2; Revelation 4:11). It is the power by which Christ maintains the universe (Hebrews 1:2–3). It is given to all who repent of their sins and are baptized (Acts 2:38–39) and is the power (Acts 1:8; 2 Timothy 1:6–7) by which all believers may be 'overcomers' (Romans 8:37 (KJV); Revelation 2:26–27) and will be led to eternal life."

Scripture mentions prayer to the Father, and to the Son, but the Holy Spirit is never prayed to nor worshiped in the Bible; in the Revelation of John, there is praise to the "One who sits upon the throne" (God), "and to the Lamb" (Jesus), but the Spirit is not mentioned; modern binitarians conclude that this is because the Holy Spirit is not a person of the God family, but the mind of God.

Binitarians believe that statements from early Christian leaders such as Melito of Sardis and Polycarp of Smyrna were binitarian, though most mainstream scholars do not accept this assertion. Binitarians point out, for example, while both call the Father and Son "God", not only do neither refer to the Holy Spirit as God, Melito's "Oration on Our Lord's Passion" suggests that the Holy Spirit is simply the power of God in action. Binitarians have noted that Paul honors the Father and the Son towards the beginning of every book he wrote, but never does so for the Holy Spirit. Trinitarians see Romans 1:4 "And declared to be the Son of God with power, according to the spirit of holiness, by the resurrection from the dead:", Ephesians 1:13 "In whom ye also trusted, after that ye heard the word of truth, the gospel of your salvation: in whom also after that ye believed, ye were sealed with that Holy Spirit of promise", 1 Thessalonians 1:5–6 "For our gospel came not unto you in word only, but also in power, and in the Holy Ghost (cor. gk. pneuma, air, breath, breeze, Spirit), and in much assurance; as ye know what manner of men we were among you for your sake. And ye became followers of us, and of the Lord, having received the word in much affliction, with joy of the Holy Ghost (cor. Spirit):" and 1 Timothy 1:14 "And the grace of our Lord was exceeding abundant with faith and love which is in Christ Jesus." as exceptions.

By not considering that the Holy Spirit is a person of God, or God's mind, some binitarians were also called the Pneumatomachi, as a subset of Semi-Arians. The Catholic historian Epiphanius described them as "A sort of monstrous, half-formed people of two natures."

Roman Catholicism and Eastern Orthodoxy 
Binitarians from groups originating in the old Worldwide Church of God (the current Worldwide Church of God is now trinitarian), believe that the teaching from Romans 8:29 about Jesus being "the firstborn among many brethren" demonstrates that Christians will be in the Family called "God". The view that God is a Family that Christians can expect to be born into is not widely held within groups that profess Christianity. However, there is a sense in which trinitarians believe that, by being united with Christ, a Christian becomes a participant in the Son's communion with the Father, they become sons by adoption and brothers to Christ, and "sharers in the divine nature" (although Eastern Orthodox Christians would have reservations regarding how "nature" would be interpreted). This contrasting, majority view has been thoroughly developed in the Catholic, Trinitarian tradition inherited by most Protestants.

For example, the Trinitarian Eastern Orthodox Church teaches that Christians will by grace become so entirely conformed to the will, purpose, and character of God, that they will be gods by the grace of God, but not on the same level of the Uncreated God. Timothy Ware, an Eastern Orthodox theologian, wrote, "St. Athanasius summed up the purpose of the Incarnation by saying, 'God became human that we might be made God'...we are God's 'offspring' (or generation) (Acts xvii, 28), His kin ... we will become 'like' God, we will acquire divine likeness; In the words of John Damascene ... To acquire the likeness is to be deified, it is to become a 'second god', a god by grace'. 'I said, ye are gods, and all of ye children of the Most High' (Psalm lxxxi, 6; cf John x, 34–35) ... Such, according to the teaching of the Orthodox Church, is the final goal at which every Christian must attain: to become like God, to obtain theosis, 'deification' or 'divinization'. For Orthodoxy human salvation and redemption mean something close to, but not the same as, deification...deification is not something reserved for a select few initiates, but is something intended for all alike, but only in the sense of attainment of heavenly attributes. The Orthodox Church believes this is the normal goal of every Christian without exception. Certainly we shall only be deified on the Last Day; but for each of us the process of divinization must begin here and now in this present life." Western Christians often vigorously avoid the terminology of deification, divinization, or theosis, while not necessarily rejecting the intended doctrine expressed in different terms.

Modern binitarians strongly agree with these Eastern Orthodox statements concerning deification, as they understand them. However, in Eastern Orthodoxy, theosis is profoundly linked to a Trinitarian understanding of God, laying special emphasis on the Holy Spirit as containing and communicating the fullness of God, not as an intermediary, but as God indeed. In Eastern Orthodoxy especially, to deny that the Holy Spirit eternally proceeds from the Father alone but rather from both the Father and the Son, as the filioque states, is seen as tending toward binitarian monotheism, or worse, bitheism. The Roman Church accepted and urged adoption of the filioque, which formed the theological rationale for the schism with the Eastern Orthodox in 1054. The Orthodox urge that these filioque statements must be rejected because the theological understanding of the Spirit is directly attached to consequent notions of what the unity of God is, the unity of the gift of God in giving his Son and His Spirit, and thus what "salvation" means and by what principle it is lived out. In addition, the Orthodox view of theosis only allows humans to be united with God in his "energies", but never with God's "essence", as God remains completely transcendent in His essence.

Binitarians look forward to their hope of being deified, and deny that the trinitarian or Chalcedonian doctrines uniquely assert anything necessary to a godly faith, along with Mormons. Nevertheless, as they do not see the strict monotheism or the trinitarianism of Eastern Orthodoxy as contributing anything essential and necessary, these binitarians see themselves as closer to the Eastern Orthodox than to "theosis" as found in Western (Augustinian) Christianity, or the Mormon views of deification, as they understand these doctrines.

The Oriental Orthodox position is the same as the Eastern Orthodox position; however, they do not accept the wording of the Chalcedonian Creed.

See also 
Armstrongism
Conceptions of God
First Council of Constantinople (381)
Names of God
Nontrinitarianism
Pneumatomachi
Trinity
Lectures on Faith early Mormon work on a two-person Godhead

References

Further reading 
 Barker, Margaret. The Great Angel: A Study of Israel's Second God. Louisville, KY: Westminster / John Knox Publishers, 1992.
 Barnes, Michel Rene. "Early Christian Binitarianism: The Father and the Holy Spirit" (paper presented at the North American Patristics Society, May 2001).

 Boyarin, Daniel. "The Gospel of the Memra: Jewish Binitarianism and the Prologue to John." Harvard Theological Review 94.3 (2001): 243-284.
 Boyarin, Daniel, “Two Powers in Heaven; or, The Making of a Heresy,” Pages 331-370 in The Idea of Biblical Interpretation: Essays in Honor of James L. Kugel. Leiden: Brill, 2003
 Briggman, Anthony. "Measuring Justin's approach to the spirit: Trinitarian conviction and binitarian orientation." Vigiliae christianae 63.2 (2009): 107-137.
 Bucur, Bogdan G. "“Early Christian binitarianism”: From religious phenomenon to polemical insult to scholarly concept." Modern Theology 27.1 (2011): 102-120.
 Bucur, Bogdan G. "Hierarchy, Prophecy, and the Angelomorphic Spirit: A Contribution to the Study of the Book of Revelation's Wirkungsgeschichte." Journal of Biblical Literature 127.1 (2008): 173-194.
 Fossum, Jarl E. The Image of the Invisible God: Essays on the Influence of Jewish Mysticism on Early Christology. Göttingen: Vandenhoeck and Ruprecht, 1995
 
 Horbury, William "Jewish Messianism and the Cult of Christ (London: SCM Press, 1998), esp. p. 123
 Hurtado, Larry W. "One God One Lord: Early Christian Devotion and Ancient Jewish Monotheism" 1988
 
 Lee, Aquila H. I. From Messiah to Pre-existent Son. Wissenschaftliche Untersuchungen zum Neuen Testament 192. Tübingen: Mohr-Siebeck, 2005; reprinted Wipf and Stock, 2009
 Schremer, Adiel. "Midrash, Theology, and History: Two Powers in Heaven Revisited." Journal for the Study of Judaism 39.2 (2008): 230-254.

External links 
 
 

Nontrinitarianism
Conceptions of God
Church of God (Armstrong)
Christian terminology